Pterogobius is a genus of fish in the goby subfamily, Gobionellinae, native to the northwestern Pacific Ocean.

Species
There are currently four recognized species in this genus:
 Pterogobius elapoides (Günther, 1872) – serpentine goby
 Pterogobius virgo (Temminck & Schlegel, 1845) – maiden goby
 Pterogobius zacalles D. S. Jordan & Snyder, 1901
 Pterogobius zonoleucus D. S. Jordan & Snyder, 1901

References

Further reading
Kai, Y., et al. (2008). Evolution of Pacific Ocean and the Sea of Japan populations of the gobiid species, Pterogobius elapoides and Pterogobius zonoleucus, based on molecular and morphological analyses. Gene 427, 7-18.

Gobionellinae